Karay may refer to
 Karay (surname)
 Karay-a people of the Philippines
 Karay-a language, spoken by the Karay-a people
 Karay, a common dog name in Russia
Count Nikolai Rostov's dog in some translations of Tolstoy's War and Peace
The dog which played the role of Sharik in Heart of a Dog (1988 film)

See also
Karai (disambiguation)
Qarai (disambiguation)